is a Japanese shōjo manga series written and illustrated by Makino. It is published by Kodansha since 2014, with serialization on Bessatsu Friend.

A live-action film adaptation with the international title The Black Devil and the White Prince was released on February 27, 2016, with a short Japanese television drama mini-series in airing on Nippon TV in December 2015 to promote the film.

On October 15, 2020, it was announced the manga will end with the 18th volume in March 2021.

Characters

; portrayed by: Nana Komatsu
She was bullied in her middle school years, thus resulting her to change. After being kissed by Haruto, she has become obedient to him. Unaware that she was already falling for him, she only remembers the bad things he made her do.

; portrayed by: Kento Nakajima
He is called the Black Prince since his hair was cut but Yū still calls him Black Demon. Even though he shows a bad expression, it is stated by Takumi that he is really kind. He stated that the only person he could never beat is Takumi.

; portrayed by: Yudai Chiba
He is called the White Prince because of his good attitude. When he found out that Haruto is interested in Yū, he treats her as a game but falls in love with her. He tells Haruto if Haruto and Yū becomes a couple, they won't be friends anymore. In the manga, Yuu called him a White Demon when she found out about him using her as a game.

; portrayed by: 
He is a big fan of Haruto and is willing to do everything to please him. He stated that if he was a girl, he will fall in love with Haruto.

Portrayed by: Sara Takatsuki
Meiko is Yuu's best friend. She is in love with Haruto ever since he saved her from the pool. When she found out that Yuu has feelings for him, She didn't want their friendship to be destroyed

Media

Manga
1 (June 13, 2014)
2 (September 12, 2014)
3 (January 13, 2015)
4 (May 13, 2015)
5 (November 13, 2015)
6 (February 12, 2016)
7 (July 13, 2016)
8 (November 11, 2016)
9 (April 13, 2017)
10 (September 13, 2017)
11 (February 13, 2018)
12 (July 13, 2018)
13 (January 11, 2019)
14 (June 13, 2019)
15 (November 13, 2019)
16 (April 13, 2020)
17 (October 13, 2020)

Film
The film is also titled The Black Devil and the White Prince for international markets.

The theme song of the TV series and film is "Make my day" by Sexy Zone.

Reception
Volume 3 reached the 27th place on the weekly Oricon manga charts, with 34,442 copies sold; volume 4 reached the 13th place and, as of May 24, 2015, had sold 60,592 copies; volume 5 reached the 12th place and, as of November 22, 2015, had sold 71,084 copies.

References

External links
Kurosaki-kun no Iinari ni Nante Naranai at Bessatsu Friend 
Kurosaki-kun no Iinari ni Nante Naranai at Nippon Television 
Film official website 

Romantic comedy anime and manga
Japanese romantic comedy films
2016 romantic comedy films
Live-action films based on manga
Kodansha manga
Shōjo manga
Manga adapted into films
Nippon TV original programming
2015 Japanese television series debuts
2015 Japanese television series endings
2010s Japanese films
Films directed by Shō Tsukikawa